The Eurovision Song Contest 1976 was the 21st edition of the annual Eurovision Song Contest. Organised by the European Broadcasting Union (EBU) and host broadcaster Nederlandse Omroep Stichting (NOS), the contest was held at the Nederlands Congrescentrum on 3 April 1976 and was hosted by 1957 Dutch Eurovision winner Corry Brokken.

Malta would not return to the contest again until 1991. On the other hand,  and  returned to the competition, having been absent since 1972 and 1974 respectively.

 won the contest this year with the song "Save Your Kisses for Me" by Brotherhood of Man. The song went on to become the biggest selling winning single in the history of the contest and won with 80.39% of the possible maximum score and an average of 9.65 of 12; a record under the voting system introduced in 1975.

Location 

The Hague is the seat of government of the Kingdom of the Netherlands and the capital city of the province of South Holland. It is also the third-largest city in the Netherlands, after Amsterdam and Rotterdam. Located in the west of the Netherlands, The Hague is in the centre of the Haaglanden conurbation and lies at the southwest corner of the larger Randstad conurbation. The contest took place at the Congresgebouw (presently known as the World Forum). The venue was constructed in 1969.

Format 
As with the Dutch hosted contest of 1970, each song was introduced by a pre-recorded film of the performing artist on location in their home nation. Unlike the 1970 films, the Dutch broadcaster made all of the films themselves, sending a crew to each nation to capture the footage. Both the artists from Monaco and Luxembourg were filmed in their respective nations, despite again not being from the country they were representing. Each film was preceded by an animated insert featuring the flags of the eighteen participating nations and ended with a profile shot of the artists.

The interval act was The Dutch Swing College Band led by Peter Schilperoort, who performed live on the stage, intercut with brief interviews with the artists from France, Israel, Austria, Belgium and Spain backstage in the green room conducted by Hans van Willigenburg. Willigenburg asked each of the five artists which song they thought would win, but only French singer Catherine Ferry was willing to give a definite answer; correctly predicting the United Kingdom.

The scoring system introduced in the previous year's competition returned in 1976. Each jury voted internally and awarded 12 points to the highest scoring song, 10 to the second highest, then 8 to the third, and then 7 to 1 (from fourth to tenth best song, according to the jury). Unlike today, the points were not given in order (from 1 up to 12), but in the order the songs were performed. The current procedure was not established until 1980 (also held in The Hague).

Participating countries 

Sweden, Malta and Turkey all decided not to participate this year, while Austria and Greece returned to the contest, making for eighteen participating countries.

Sweden did not enter the contest as broadcaster Sveriges Radio (SR) did not have enough money to host another contest if Sweden should win again. A new rule was therefore introduced that in the future each participating broadcaster would have to pay a part of the cost of staging the contest. As the author and historian John Kennedy O'Connor notes in his book The Eurovision Song Contest – The Official History, there had been public demonstrations in Sweden against the contest, which also played a part in SR's decision not to take part.

Conductors 
Each performance had a conductor who led the orchestral accompaniment.

 Alyn Ainsworth
 Mario Robbiani
 Les Humphries
 Matti Caspi
 Jo Plée
 Michel Bernholc
 Noel Kelehan
 Harry van Hoof
 Frode Thingnæs
 
 Ossi Runne
 Joan Barcons
 Maurizio Fabrizio
 Erich Kleinschuster
 
 Raymond Donnez

Returning artists

Participants and results 

The following tables reflect the officially verified scores given by each jury, adjusted after the transmission. During the live broadcast, France failed to announce the 4 points they awarded to Yugoslavia, an error overlooked by the scrutineer, Clifford Brown. Thus in the live show, Norway were placed 17th and Yugoslavia 18th. After the broadcast, the scores were adjusted and the two nations swapped places, with Yugoslavia's score being adjusted from 6 to 10 points, moving Norway down to last place.

In terms of points gained as a percentage of maximum available, the winning UK entry from Brotherhood of Man is statistically the most successful winning Eurovision entry since the introduction of the 'douze points' scoring system inaugurated in 1975.

Detailed voting results

12 points 
Below is a summary of all 12 points in the final:

Spokespersons 

Listed below is the order in which votes were cast during the 1976 contest along with the spokesperson who was responsible for announcing the votes for their respective country.

 Ray Moore
 Michel Stocker
 
 
 Jacques Harvey
 André Hagon
 Brendan Balfe
 Dick van Bommel
 
 Irini Gavala
 
 José María Íñigo
 Rosanna Vaudetti
 
 Ana Zanatti
 Carole Chabrier
 Marc Menant
 Sandi Čolnik

Broadcasts 

Each participating broadcaster was required to relay the contest via its networks. Non-participating EBU member broadcasters were also able to relay the contest as "passive participants". Broadcasters were able to send commentators to provide coverage of the contest in their own native language and to relay information about the artists and songs to their television viewers.

Known details on the broadcasts in each country, including the specific broadcasting stations and commentators are shown in the tables below. In addition to the participating countries, the contest was also reportedly broadcast in Algeria, Hong Kong, Iceland, Morocco, Tunisia and Turkey.

See also 
 OTI Festival 1976

Notes

References

External links

 

 
1976
Music festivals in the Netherlands
1976 in music
1976 in the Netherlands
20th century in The Hague
April 1976 events in Europe
Events in The Hague
Music in The Hague